Haugaland or Haugalandet is a traditional district situated on the western coast of Norway. Haugaland is one of the 15 traditional districts located within the Vestlandet region.

Geographically, Haugaland is a peninsula between Bømlafjorden in Vestland county and Boknafjorden in the northern part of Rogaland county, Nord-Rogaland. It is bordered to the east of the isthmus between Ølensfjorden and Sandeidfjorden in Vindafjord municipality. It is limited by Hardangerfjorden to the north, Boknafjorden to the south, and the district of Hardanger which is located further inland.

Administratively, the region of Haugaland spans slightly more than the geographic peninsula.  It includes the municipality of Sveio in Vestland county and the municipalities of Haugesund, Karmøy, Utsira, Tysvær, Bokn, and Vindafjord in Rogaland.  The municipality of Etne (in Vestland) is considered part of Haugaland too.  The regional centre of Haugaland is the city of Haugesund. Other towns in Haugaland include Kopervik, Skudeneshavn, and Åkrehamn. As of 2015, there were 99,293 inhabitants within Haugaland.

Etymology
The name Haugaland was created in 1852 by poet and creator of Nynorsk, Ivar Aasen. His first use of the name was in his poem "Haraldshaugen". Haugaland is named after the center of the district, Haugesund.

Administration

Haugaland Council
Haugaland Council (Haugalandrådet) is the consultative body for the municipalities that make up Haugaland. Council members are the mayors and councilors. Haugaland Council contributes to the cooperation between the member municipalities, and safeguard the region's interests in relation to neighboring regions, county and national bodies.

Haugaland museums
Haugaland museums (Haugalandmuseene) is the regional museum for the area of Rogaland County north of Boknafjorden.   Haugalandmuseene was founded in 2005. Haugalandmuseene has a decentralized structure, with administration located at Karmsund folk museum. Haugalandmuseene has locations in Haugesund, Tysvær, Vindafjord, Bokn, and Utsira.  The regional museum has the responsibility of organizing joint actions with the museums and the municipalities.

Haugaland and Sunnhordland Police District
Haugaland and Sunnhordland Police District (Haugaland og Sunnhordland politidistrikt) is headquartered in Haugesund. The police district covers the 13 municipalities of Bokn, Bømlo, Etne, Fitjar, Haugesund, Karmøy, Sauda, Stord, Suldal, Sveio, Tysvær, Utsira, and Vindafjord.

Haugaland District Court
Haugaland District Court (Haugaland tingrett) is the local Court of Justice for the traditional district of Haugaland. The Court House is located in Haugesund at the City Hall Square. Haugaland District Court had jurisdiction over the municipalities Bokn, Etne, Haugesund, Karmøy, Sauda, Suldal, Tysvær, Utsira, and Vindafjord. The Court’s decisions may be appealed to Gulating Court of Appeal based in Bergen, which covers the counties of Vestland and Rogaland.

References

Other sources

External links 
Haugesund & Haugalandet
Haugalandrådet
Haugalandmuseene
Haugaland og Sunnhordland politidistrikt
 Haugaland Zoo

Districts of Vestland
Districts of Rogaland
Peninsulas of Norway
Peninsulas of Vestland
Landforms of Rogaland